Bonbeach is a suburb in Melbourne, Victoria, Australia, 31 km south-east of Melbourne's Central Business District, located within the City of Kingston local government area.

Facilities

The entire coastline of Bonbeach consists of a sandy beach facing Port Phillip. Bonbeach has a string of cafés and restaurants along the Nepean Highway.

Since 1926, Bonbeach has been serviced by Bonbeach railway station; a two-platform station on the Frankston line. This station was used during the filming of a scene in the Australian television series Kath & Kim.

Bonbeach Post Office opened on 19 November 1922 (closing in 1923, then reopening in 1926 on the opening of the railway station) and finally closed in 1985.

Bonbeach has a school called Bonbeach Primary School.

The town has an Australian Rules football team competing in the Mornington Peninsula Nepean Football League and a cricket team competing in the Cricket Southern Bayside competition. Golfers play at the course of the Patterson River Country Club alongside the river. The Bonbeach Lifesaving Club has been running for 75 years.

Politics

State Politics
Since the state election on 29 November 2014, Carrum has been represented by Labor MP Sonya Kilkenny in Victoria's Legislative Assembly.

Members for Carrum:

Federal government
Bonbeach falls within the Federal lower house Electorate of Isaacs. Bonbeach's current federal MP is Labor's shadow Attorney-General Mark Dreyfus who has held the position since 2007. The Division of Isaacs is considered a safe Labor seat.

See also
 City of Chelsea – Bonbeach was previously within this former local government area.

References

Suburbs of Melbourne
Suburbs of the City of Kingston (Victoria)
Port Phillip